Awesome TV is a free-to-air Malaysian television channel owned by Awesome Media Network Sdn Bhd. The channel features first-run local original production and foreign content. Awesome TV started its trial broadcast on 28 July 2020 and full operation started on 1 August 2020. Awesome TV can be watched for free nationwide via myFreeview platform on Channel 112 and Astro on Channel 123.

History

Awesome TV is a digital television channel headquartered in Malaysia and being the first to officially commence broadcasting through the usage of digital encoding only via DVB-T2 set-top box for viewers in Malaysia. Viewers could watch this channel during trial broadcasting of this channel from 28 July 2020 at 12:00 pm to 3 August 2020 when it was finally launched. At this point of time, Awesome TV does not have any main news time slot either through standalone or from other broadcast television channel.

On 7 January 2021, Awesome TV announced on their official Facebook account that the channel would broadcast on Astro starting around January 2021.

On 16 January 2021, the managing director of Awesome TV, Johan Ishak, announced on his Facebook account that Awesome TV would start airing through Astro from 18 January 2021 on Channel 123.[7]

Starting February 1, 2022, Awesome TV broadcasts its own news, Berita 7:57, the same as Buletin Utama on TV3. The prime time news program was broadcast live from 33, Jalan Rakyat, Brickfields, 50470 Kuala Lumpur.

Overview
Awesome TV is the first free television channel in Malaysia and Kuala Lumpur to officially start broadcasting without the use of analog transmitters, which all users of DVB-T2 decoders in Malaysia can watch this channel from the beginning of the channel's existence.

Starting April 1, 2020, the Astro Ria HD channel number has been replaced with channel 104 and Awesome TV will start broadcasting on Astro channel 123 starting January 18, 2021.

Programming

Original programmes (by Awesome TV)
2020
 A! Ketawa
 Anugerah Malam Ini
 Awesome Minggu Ini
 Chit Chat Ustaz
 Debat Bukan Gaduh
 Fans VS Fanatik
 Glam Ke Tenggelam
 Ha Ha Ha
 Hentam Saja...Lah!
 Ihsan Kita Jaman Tori Janda Kosmopolitan Jawapan Panas Keringat Selebriti Langit Bakal Cerah Macam-Macam Show Masaklah Kaw Masak Ni Senang! Mic On! Mummy Oja Ohsem!!! On X on One Two Hantu Oops Terkena Pop Yeah Yeah Ragam Riuh Family Rumah Rara Shuk Nak Tanya Shuk Nak Tanya 2 Tok Kata Transparensi Ujian Menantu Warung Wak You Kat...?2021
 Alamak (8 June)
 Awesome Mart (23 April)
 Glam Ke Teng'glam 2 Lahar Net (6 March)
 Layan Karok (9 January)
 One Two Hantu 22022
 Mic On! Season 2 (28 January)
 Warung Wak 3News programme
 Berita 7:57

Local/foreign programmes
2020
 Baby Riki Cam and Leon Captain Biceps Chronokids Crafty Kids Club Drakers Go Explore Go Travel Kickers Kuali Terbalik Liver or Die Love in the Moonlight Makan Megaman Fully Charged Mr. Bean Animated Series My Love From Another Star (Original language)
 Meow, the Secret Boy (11 November)
 My Fellow Citizens Oggy and the Cockroaches Oh My Venus Orang Ketiga Pi Mai Pi Mai Tang Tu Princess Hours Thailand Rindu Tanpa Cinta Senario Sissi: The Young Empress (Animated) Supper Heroes Tales of Nokdu The Eco Traveller The Halal Foodie2021
 Adventurous Fins Hantu Van Sewa (8 January)
 Rainbow Rangers Rat-A-Tat Temperature of Love The Good Witch The Last Empress (TV series) (29 April)

2022
 Beyblade Burst Beyblade Burst Evolution Beyblade Burst Turbo Beyblade Burst Rise Shaun the Sheep (Season 1) (Coming Soon)
 Just for Laughs Gags (Season 12) (Coming Soon)
 Knight Rider (1982 TV series) (Season 1) (4 January) (Tuesday 11:30pm to Wednesday 12:30am), (Wednesday 11:30pm to Thursday 12:30am)
 The A-Team'' (29 March) (Tuesday 11:30pm to Wednesday 12:30am), (Wednesday 11:30pm to Thursday 12:30am)

See also 
 List of television stations in Malaysia

References

External links
 

Television stations in Malaysia
Television channels and stations established in 2020
2020 establishments in Malaysia